Shipley is an English surname. Notable people with the surname include:

A. Q. Shipley (Allan Quay Shipley) (born 1986), American football lineman
Ann Shipley (1899–1981), Canadian politician
Arthur Everett Shipley GBE FRS (1861–1927), British zoologist, Vice-Chancellor University of Cambridge.
Braden Shipley (born 1992), American baseball player
Burton Shipley (1890–1976), first Maryland Tarrapins men's basketball coach
Debra Shipley (born 1957), British politician
Don Shipley (stage director), Canadian stage director
Don Shipley (Navy SEAL), Virginia, SEAL-like trainer for civilians
Jenny Shipley (born 1952), ex-Prime Minister of New Zealand
John Shipley (poker player) (born 1960), English poker player
John Shipley, Baron Shipley (born 1946), OBE, a Liberal Democrat peer in the House of Lords
Jonathan Shipley (bishop) (1714–1788), 18th century clergyman
Jordan Shipley (born 1985), American football wide receiver
Joseph Twadell Shipley (1893–1981), American drama critic, author, editor and professor
Mike Shipley (1956–2013), record producer and mixer
Rebecca Shipley, British mathematician, Professor of Healthcare Engineering at University College London
Reece Shipley (1921–1998), American country musician
Ruth Shipley (1885–1966), head of the Passport Division of the U.S. State Department
Tom Shipley, musician in the 1970s folk-rock duo Brewer & Shipley
Tony Shipley (born 1953), former State Representative in  Tennessee, in U.S.
Tyler Shipley, musician and lead singer of The Consumer Goods
Walter V. Shipley (1935–2019), American banker
Wil Shipley (born 1969), software developer
Will Shipley (born 2002), American football player
William Shipley (1715–1803), Royal Society of Arts      

English toponymic surnames